Andrea Lodovico de Adamich (born 3 October 1941) is a former racing driver from Italy.  He participated in 34 World Championship Formula One Grands Prix, making his debut on 1 January 1968.  He scored a total of six championship points. He also participated in numerous non-championship Formula One races.

Career

De Adamich was born in Trieste, from a family originally from Croatia. One of his ancestors, Andrija Ljudevit Adamić, had been the wealthiest and most powerful merchant in Rijeka in the 18th century. Andrea de Adamich was an accomplished saloon and sport-car racer who performed solidly when asked to race in Formula One where he was one of the few drivers to have worn glasses to race.

He won the 1966 European Touring Car Championship at the start of a long relationship with Alfa Romeo and made his GP debut in the 1968 South African race when his Ferrari spun off on oil.  Later in the season he won the South American Temporada F2 Championship in Argentina with Ferrari but was not retained by the Italian team and he returned to the Alfa Romeo fold as they entered F1 supplying engines to a third works McLaren.  De Adamich only finished once in 1970 in the McLaren-Alfa and the following year was no more successful when the Alfa engine deal switched to March.

In 1972 De Adamich joined the Surtees team and scored his first Formula One points when he finished fourth in the Spanish GP at Jarama. In 1973 he moved to Brabham. After a promising start of the season, when he finished again fourth in the Belgian GP at Zolder, De Adamich career was ended abruptly due to injuries sustained in a multiple-car pile-up at the British GP. The accident happened when Jody Scheckter, running fourth in his McLaren, spun across the track at Woodcote Corner at the end of the first lap, causing many other cars to collide and crash. The incident eliminated nine cars, including all three works Surtees cars. 

De Adamich retired the following year and became a respected motor sport journalist and TV pundit in his native Italy. From 1978 through 2012 he hosted the TV sport program Grand Prix on Italia 1.

He is currently the vice-president of N.Technology which prepares race cars for Alfa Romeo.

Racing record

Complete European Formula Two Championship results
(key)

Complete Formula One World Championship results
(key)

Non-championship Formula One results
(key)

Complete European F5000 Championship results
(key) (Races in bold indicate pole position; races in italics indicate fastest lap.)

Complete 24 Hours of Le Mans results

See also
 Croats of Italy

References

External links
 Profile on Historic Racing

1941 births
Living people
24 Hours of Le Mans drivers
Brabham Formula One drivers
European Formula Two Championship drivers
European Touring Car Championship drivers
Ferrari Formula One drivers
Formula One journalists and reporters
Italian Formula One drivers
Italian Formula Three Championship drivers
Italian racing drivers
March Formula One drivers
McLaren Formula One drivers
Sportspeople from Trieste
Surtees Formula One drivers
World Sportscar Championship drivers
Italian motorsport people
Italian people of Croatian descent